Guettardeae is a tribe of flowering plants in the family Rubiaceae and contains about 748 species in 14 genera. Its representatives are widespread geographically and are found in the tropics and subtropics.

Genera 
Currently accepted names

 Antirhea Comm. ex A.Juss. (38 sp)
 Arachnothryx Planch. (107 sp)
 Bobea Gaudich. (4 sp)
 Chomelia Jacq. (79 sp)
 Gonzalagunia Ruiz & Pav. (40 sp)
 Guettarda L. (157 sp)
 Hodgkinsonia F.Muell. (2 sp)
 Machaonia Humb. & Bonpl. (31 sp)
 Malanea Aubl. (40 sp)
 Neoblakea Standl. (2 sp)
 Rogiera Planch. (15 sp)
 Stenostomum C.F.Gaertn. (49 sp)
 Timonius Rumph. ex DC. (182 sp)
 Tinadendron Achille (2 sp)

Synonyms

 Abbottia F.Muell. = Timonius
 Allenanthus Standl. = Machaonia
 Anisomeris C.Presl = Chomelia
 Bellermannia Klotzsch ex H.Karst. = Gonzalagunia
 Bobaea A.Rich. = Bobea
 Buena Cav. = Gonzalagunia
 Bunophila Willd. ex Roem. & Schult. = Machaonia
 Burneya Cham. & Schltdl. = Timonius
 Cadamba Sonn. = Guettarda
 Caruelina Kuntze = Chomelia
 Caryococca Willd. ex Roem. & Schult. = Gonzalagunia
 Cuatrecasasiodendron Steyerm. = Arachnothryx
 Cunninghamia Schreb. = Malanea
 Dicrobotryum Willd. ex Schult. = Guettarda
 Donkelaaria Lem. = Guettarda
 Duggena Vahl ex Standl. = Gonzalagunia
 Edechia Loefl. = Guettarda
 Erithalis G.Forst. = Timonius
 Eupyrena Wight & Arn. = Timonius
 Gonzalea Pers. = Gonzalagunia
 Halesia P.Browne = Guettarda
 Helospora Jacq. = Timonius
 Javorkaea Borhidi & Jarai-Koml. = Arachnothryx
 Laugeria L. = Guettarda
 Laugeria Vahl ex Hook.f. = Stenostomum
 Laugieria Jacq. = Guettarda
 Matthiola L. = Guettarda
 Microsplenium Hook.f. = Machaonia
 Neolaugeria Nicolson = Stenostomum
 Obbea Hook.f. = Bobea
 Otocalyx Brandegee = Arachnothryx
 Polyphragmon Desf. = Timonius
 Porocarpus Gaertn. = Timonius
 Resinanthus (Borhidi) Borhidi = Stenostomum
 Rytidotus Hook.f. = Bobea
 Sardinia Vell. = Guettarda
 Schiedea A.Rich. = Machaonia
 Siphonandra Turcz. = Arachnothryx
 Sturmia C.F.Gaertn. = Stenostomum
 Terebraria Sessé ex Kuntze = Stenostomum
 Tertrea DC. = Machaonia
 Tournefortiopsis Rusby = Guettarda
 Viviania Raf. = Guettarda

References 

 
Cinchonoideae tribes